There are two lists of free trade areas:
 List of bilateral free-trade agreements
 List of multilateral free-trade agreements